Werner Spycher (born 22 November 1916) was a Swiss wrestler. He competed in the men's freestyle featherweight at the 1936 Summer Olympics.

References

External links
  

1916 births
Possibly living people
Swiss male sport wrestlers
Olympic wrestlers of Switzerland
Wrestlers at the 1936 Summer Olympics
Place of birth missing